The Warwolves are fictional characters appearing in American comic books published by Marvel Comics.

Characteristics
The Warwolves were originally a group of extra-dimensional agents of Mojo as part of his Wildways, originating from Mojoworld in the Mojoverse.  Mojo originally engineered the Warwolves as a pack of six sentient canine/humanoid servants, artificially created through genetic engineering by Mojo's scientists.

The Warwolves are ruthless hunters, with a strong sense of humor and a fondness for televised entertainment. Warwolves can stand erect on their hind legs or walk or run on all fours; their front paws can be used as hands or feet. Warwolves are immune to direct attack by psionic energy. Warwolves can track their prey by scent as Earth canines do. Warwolves also possess remarkable leaping ability.

Warwolves have slick, smooth skins and have sharp claws on each paw. The Warwolves have the power to drain the life essence of a victim by inserting their tongues into an orifice, causing the victim's skeleton and internal organs to discorporate, leaving behind an intact skin. Warwolves can wear the actual skin and clothing of the victim to masquerade as that person, altering their shape to resemble the prey perfectly. Warwolves can also mimic the voices of their victims or of other persons. A group of Warwolves can together psionically create an inter-dimensional portal and merge into a single being while retaining their individual heads and psyches.

Fictional character biography
The Warwolves (Bowzer, Ducks, Jacko, Popsie, Scarper, and one unnamed Warwolf) first appeared on Earth when Phoenix escaped from captivity by Mojo, and Mojo sent the Warwolves to London to recapture her.  The Warwolves, Nightcrawler, and Gatecrasher's Technet fought over Rachel and during the fight, the original Ferro was killed. When Captain Britain, Meggan, Nightcrawler, and Shadowcat helped Rachel defeat the Warwolves, they formed together as a team and called themselves Excalibur for the first time. The Warwolves clashed with Excalibur many times, operating out of a den near the Hob's End underground transportation tunnel. Rachel killed Bowzer in one encounter and in another, an unnamed Warwolf was killed.

Later, the remaining Warwolves on Earth abducted Shadowcat. In an attempt to defeat the Warwolves once and for all, Shadowcat actually used her phasing power to become merged with and control Ducks; she eventually escaped from Ducks with the aid of her team. The Warwolves were defeated and captured by Excalibur, and were interred in a transparent cage in the London Zoo, where they became a popular attraction despite their dangerous nature.

The Warwolves would briefly escape when the two allegedly "dead" Warwolves returned and teamed with the four captives, and kill people who resembled the X-Men in order to impersonate the X-Men and ambush Excalibur. They captured Rachel Summers, but were forced through an inter-dimensional portal by Excalibur, who rescued Summers.

Later, when Roma perceived Franklin Richards to be a threat, not only to his home reality (Earth-616) but to all of reality, she dispatched the Warwolves, Gatecrasher and her Technet to kidnap him. Roma teleported the Fantastic Four and Alyssa Moy (who was babysitting Franklin at the time) to Otherworld when they opposed her plan, to face the full fury of the entire Corps. The Warwolves reappeared when they escaped the zoo in order to get revenge on the new Excalibur team, but were beaten back and have gone into hiding.

Years later, the Warwolves appeared in the employ of the interdimensional slave trader Tullamore Voge. When Nightcrawler and Bloody Bess invaded Voge's child slave market to rescue the X-Men students Ziggy Karst and Scorpion Boy, Voge sent the Warwolves after them. In that encounter, the Warwolves were accompanied by semi-corporeal versions of their kind, so-called Ghostwolves. They almost succeeded in killing Bess, but were all single-handedly bested by Nightcrawler.

In other media

Television
The Warwolves appear in the Avengers Assemble episode "Mojo World".

References

Characters created by Chris Claremont
Marvel Comics supervillains